With Children at the Seaside is a Bulgarian anthology comedy film released in 1972, directed by Dimitar Petrov, starring Georgi Partsalev, Petar Peychev and Ivaylo Dzhambazov. The screenplay is written by Mormarevi Brothers.

The movie consists of two separated stories that are bound by the theme about the summer seaside vacation as well as by the character of the plump teenager Pipsi. This is the second film of the "Childhood series" by Mormarevi Brothers, featuring children's characters in the main parts.

The first segment is named The Dolphin, starring mostly children led by the witty plump teenager Pipsi (Petar Peychev). The kids are obsessed by the story about a mysterious dolphin insinuated by a local fisherman and playboy who tries to tie affair with the elder sister of one of them. The second segment is named The Amateur Photographer, starring one of the leading Bulgarian comic actors, Georgi Partsalev, in the role of uncle Mancho, an aging man who flirts with a young female colleague during a pseudo business trip at the seaside. Unfortunately for them, they are accidentally photographed by the same teenager Pipsi (Petar Peychev) who turns out to be a neighbor of uncle Mancho.

As usual for the films written by Mormarevi Brothers, With Children at the Seaside obtained wide popularity and became one of the classic Bulgarian comedies from the 1970s.

Cast

Segment 1 - The Dolphin

In the roles of the children are:
 Petar Peychev as Pipsi
 Ivaylo Dzhambazov as Ivaylo
 Kiril Petrov as Kircho
 Ivan Arshinkov as Ivan
 Emil Petrov as Emil
 Krasimir Marianov as Krasimir
 Ruslan Terziyski as Ruslan
 Svetlana Krumova as Svetlana

In the roles of the adults are:
 Mihail Mutafov as Ognyan, the local fisherman
 Tatyana Novoselska as Elena, Ruslan's elder sister
 Zlatina Dzhambazova
 Krastyu Doynov

Segment 2 - The Amateur Photographer

In the roles of the children are:
 Petar Peychev as Pipsi
 Kiril Petrov as Kircho

In the roles of the adults are:
 Georgi Partsalev as uncle Mancho
 Margarita Stefanova
 Svetoslav Peev
 Renata Kiselichka

References

Sources

External links
 
 With Children at the Seaside at the Bulgarian National Film Archive 
 With Children at the Seaside at the Bulgarian National Television 

1970s Bulgarian-language films
1972 films
Bulgarian comedy films
Films set in Bulgaria
Films shot in Bulgaria
Anthology films
1972 comedy films
Films directed by Dimitar Petrov